Víctor Klein (2 October 1917 – 13 August 1995) was a Chilean footballer. He played in one match for the Chile national football team in 1945. He was also part of Chile's squad for the 1945 South American Championship.

References

External links
 

1917 births
1995 deaths
Chilean footballers
Chile international footballers
Place of birth missing
Association football defenders
Santiago Morning footballers